The Northampton Laurels FC was an American professional soccer team based in Allentown, Pennsylvania. Founded in 2005, the team played in Women's Premier Soccer League (WPSL). The team folded after the 2008 season.

The Laurels' home was J. Birney Crum Stadium, located in the city of Allentown, where they had played since 2006.  The team's colors were green and white.

History
The team featured several players with previous professional and international experience, along with local stand out talent. Playing for the Laurels provided elite Lehigh Valley-area players with an opportunity to progress through the U.S. soccer system.

In their 2006 expansion season, the Laurels were the WPSL's Eastern Conference - Southern Division runners up. In addition, the team was a semi-finalist in the 2006 WPSL Eastern Conference Playoffs. The Laurels were also the WPSL Eastern Conference Mid-Atlantic Division runners up in 2007, and an Eastern Conference Semi-Finalist.

Year-by-year

Head coaches
  Wayne Grocott (2006)
  Anthony Creece (2007–2008)

Home stadiums
 J. Birney Crum Stadium (2006–2008)

2005 establishments in Pennsylvania
2008 disestablishments in Pennsylvania
Amateur soccer teams in Pennsylvania
Association football clubs disestablished in 2008
Association football clubs established in 2005
Soccer clubs in Pennsylvania
Sports in Allentown, Pennsylvania
Women's Premier Soccer League teams
Women's soccer clubs in the United States